Iuka is an unincorporated community in Tyler County, West Virginia, United States, along Elk Fork.  Its post office is closed.

References 

Unincorporated communities in West Virginia
Unincorporated communities in Tyler County, West Virginia